Leeds Studies in English was an annual academic journal dedicated to the study of medieval English, Old Norse-Icelandic, and Anglo-Norman language and literature. It was published by the School of English at the University of Leeds. In 2020, it was announced that Leeds Studies in English would merge with the Bulletin of International Medieval Research to become Leeds Medieval Studies, based in the Leeds Institute for Medieval Studies.

Editorial policy

According to the journal's website in the decade before its transformation into Leeds Medieval Studies, 
Leeds Studies in English is an international, refereed journal based in the School of English, University of Leeds. Leeds Studies in English publishes articles on Old and Middle English literature, Old Icelandic language and literature, and the historical study of the English language. After a two-year embargo, past copies are made available free access.
Authors were encouraged to make their work available open-access at any stage of the publication process. Recent volumes also include work on Anglo-Norman, medievalism, and historical linguistics, alongside editions and translations of medieval and early modern texts.

History

The journal was begun as Leeds Studies in English & Kindred Languages by Bruce Dickins, Alan S. C. Ross and R. M. Wilson, who were then all in the Department of English Language at the University of Leeds. It was initially intended to showcase the work of staff and postgraduate students in the department. The first volume emerged in 1932, and further volumes emerged annually until 1938, at which point volumes 7 and 8 were both delayed by the outbreak of the Second World War. During 1945-46, as the war ended, the editors all took new posts, respectively at Cambridge, Birmingham and Sheffield, whereupon 'any chance of refloating Leeds Studies in English with the old crew vanished'. A. C. Cawley and Harold Orton saw volumes 7 and 8 through the press as a single volume in 1952 and hoped to publish more, but this did not eventuate.

However, a new series was launched in 1967, initially under the editorship of A. C. Cawley (who had left Leeds in 1959 but returned in 1965) and R. C. Alston (appointed in 1964), a year after the foundation at Leeds University of the journal Northern History and Alston's foundation of the Scolar Press, and in the same year as the founding of the International Medieval Bibliography and the Institute for Medieval Studies. The editors broadened the scope of the journal to invite contributions from scholars internationally. Although they shortened the title to Leeds Studies in English, they affirmed the journal's multilingual scope. A book review section was launched in 1990. From 1967 to 1977 the journal was printed by Alston's company Scolar Press, and from 1977 to 1987 the journal was printed from copy-ready type-written text at the University's own printing service. From 1986, Elizabeth Williams, Joyce Hill and Pam Armitage oversaw a transition to word-processed text, with the new format being finalised in 1991. 1986 saw the introduction of the journal's logo, 'based on a panel from the Anglo-Saxon cross in Otley Parish Church, West Yorkshire'. 

With the fortieth issue (for 2009, published in 2010), under the editorship of Alaric Hall, the journal began online free-access publication alongside print publication, with a two-year embargo, on the grounds that ‘LSE has always been published by scholars, for scholars; its purpose is to disseminate high-quality research as widely as possible’. All past issues were digitised and made available via Leeds University Library. It also transitioned to typesetting in LaTeX. Print distribution, which had previously been undertaken within Leeds's School of English, was handed over in the same year to Abramis Academic Publishing.

Editors 

Guest editors included Derek Pearsall (1983); Marie Collins, Joceyln Price and Andrew Hamer (1985); Thorlac Turville-Petre and Margaret Gelling (1987); Geraldine Barnes, Sonya Jensen, Lee Jobling and David Lawton (1989); Clive Upton and Katie Wales (1999); Sarah Carpenter, Pamela King and Peter Meredith (2001); Mary Swan (2006); Janet Burton, William Marx, and Veronica O'Mara (2010); Carole Biggam (2013); and Hannah Bailey, Karl Kinsella, and Daniel Thomas (2017).

Some special issues were Festschriften, honouring Harold Orton (1968, 1999), Arthur C. Cawley (1980-81), Elizabeth Salter (1983), J. E. Cross (1985), Kenneth Cameron (1987), H. Leslie Rogers (1989), Peter Meredith (1998), Meg Twycross (2001), Joyce Hill (2006), and Oliver Pickering (2010).

Leeds Texts and Monographs
Leeds Studies in English exists in parallel to a series of monograph publications on the same themes as the journal: originally Leeds School of English Language Texts and Monographs (eight volumes, 1935-40), then Leeds Texts and Monographs (new series, seventeen volumes, 1966-2009), and Leeds Texts and Monographs Facsimiles (publishing facsimiles of medieval English drama, eight volumes, 1973-84).

External links
Free-access archive at Institute for Medieval Studies website
Free-access archive at Leeds University Library
Free-access archive at archive.org (whole issues)
Hard copies via the printer and distributor (2009 onwards)

References

Linguistics journals